Rudolf Amenga-Etego is a Ghanaian lawyer and environmentalist. He was awarded the Goldman Environmental Prize in 2004, for his efforts on keeping water supplies affordable for the population and campaigning against privatization of water in Ghana. The main opposition is the World Bank and the International Monetary Fund who are offering loans to the Ghanese government to improve the water infrastructure across the country. The only drawbacks to these loans are their stipulations requiring the privatization of the water supply.

References 

Year of birth missing (living people)
Living people
20th-century Ghanaian lawyers
Ghanaian environmentalists
21st-century Ghanaian lawyers
Goldman Environmental Prize awardees